Funnies on Parade is an American publication of 1933 that was a precursor of comic books. The eight-page publication featured reprints of such popular syndicated comic strips as The Bungle Family, Joe Palooka, Keeping Up with the Joneses, Mutt and Jeff, Reg'lar Fellers, and Somebody's Stenog. Creators included F. O. Alexander, Gene Byrnes, Al Capp, Clare Victor Dwiggins, A. E. Hayward, C. M. Payne, Al Smith, and Harry J. Tuthill.

History

Precursor: The Funnies 
The creation of the modern American comic book came in stages. Dell Publishing in 1929 published a 16-page, newsprint periodical of original, comic strip-styled material titled The Funnies and described by the Library of Congress as "a short-lived newspaper tabloid insert". This is not to be confused with Dell's later same-name comic book, which began publication in 1936. Comics historian Ron Goulart describes the four-color, newsstand periodical as "more a Sunday comic section without the rest of the newspaper than a true comic book".

Funnies on Parade 
In early 1933, Eastern Color began producing small comic broadsides for the Ledger Syndicate of Philadelphia, printing Sunday color comics from  plates. Eastern Color sales manager Harry I. Wildenberg and his coworkers — salesperson Maxwell Gaines and owner George Janosik — realized that two such plates would fit on a tabloid-sized page.

Soon after, in April 1933, Wildenberg created the first modern-format comic book when, according to legend, he  folded a newspaper into halves and then into quarters and, finding that a convenient book size, led him to have to Eastern Color publish Funnies on Parade. Like The Funnies but 32 pages, this, too, was a newsprint magazine. Rather than using original material, however, it reprinted in color several comic strips licensed from the McNaught Syndicate, the Ledger Syndicate, and the Bell-McClure Syndicate. This periodical, however, was neither sold nor available on newsstands, but rather sent free as a promotional item to consumers who mailed in coupons clipped from Procter & Gamble soap and toiletries products. Ten-thousand copies were made. The promotion proved a success, and Eastern Color that year produced similar periodicals for Canada Dry soft drinks, Kinney Shoes, Wheatena cereal and others, with print runs of from 100,000 to 250,000.

In addition to Gaines, those associated with the project included Leverett Gleason other future industry notables working under Wildenberg's supervision.

Later in 1933, Gaines collaborated with Dell Publishing once again to publish the 36-page one-shot Famous Funnies: A Carnival of Comics, followed in 1934 by Famous Funnies, which ran for 218 issues and is considered the first true American comic book.

See also
More Fun Comics

References

External links
 CBW Comic History: The Early Years...1896 to 1937, Part II
 Coville, Jamie. The History of Comic Books: Introduction and "The Platinum Age 1897 – 1938", TheComicBooks.com, n.d. Archive of original page published at defunct site CollectorTimes.com.

Further reading
 All in Color for a Dime by Dick Lupoff & Don Thompson 
 The Official Overstreet Comic Book Price Guide by Robert Overstreet — Edition #35 
 The Steranko History of Comics, Vol. 1 & 2, by James Steranko — Vol. 1 

1933 comics debuts
1933 comics endings